Vepridaphne is a genus of sea snails, marine gastropod mollusks in the family Raphitomidae.

Species
Species within the genus Vepridaphne include:

 Vepridaphne cestrum (Hedley, 1922)

References

 Shuto, T. 1983. New turrid taxa from the Australian waters. Memoirs of the Faculty of Sciences of Kyushu University, Series D, Geology 25: 1-26.

Monotypic gastropod genera
Raphitomidae